, known as Virtua Athlete 2000 in North America, is a Sega Dreamcast track and field sports game developed by Hitmaker. Virtua Athlete 2K supports up to four local players simultaneously as to compete for the top score through all seven of its events. Virtua Athlete was released on the PlayStation 2 in Japan as part of the DecAthlete Collection with DecAthlete and Winter Heat. The collection is the 15th volume of the Sega Ages 2500 series.

Reception

The game received "mixed" reviews according to the review aggregation website Metacritic. Kevin Rice of NextGen said of the game, "Already limited by only having seven events, this game falls flat on the Olympic track with frustrating controls and disappointing gameplay." In Japan, Famitsu gave it a score of 31 out of 40.

An IGN review published following the game's release in North America read, "Best described as an interactive movie about the Olympics, Virtua Athlete is as basic a game as you can get [...] It's just too bad that the game play doesn't match their respective graphical accomplishment."

Notes

References

External links
 Sega Retro website
 
 

2000 video games
Arcade games
Dreamcast games
Multiple-sport video games
PlayStation 2 games
Sega arcade games
Sega video games
Video games developed in Japan
Agetec games